Darnytsia is a station on the Kyiv Metro's Sviatoshynsko-Brovarska Line. It was opened on 5 November 1965 as part of the westwards eastwards expansion of the Brovary radius and is the second station located fully on the left bank of the Dnipro River. It's named after the historic neighborhood of Kyiv, Darnytsia.

Designed by architects I.Maslenkov and V.Bogdanovsky, the station presents itself as a simple surface platform with a pillar-supported concrete canopy, a design that is almost identical to the three other stations that opened along with it and typical for the 1960s public architecture. Originally a terminus, not far from the station is the "Darnytsia" depot which was the first fully operational in Kyiv, and also served the Obolonsko–Teremkivska Line from 1976 until 1982 when the "Obolon" depot opened.

The Darnytsia station is located on the edge of a large park and on the Brovary Avenue. Originally the station had only one entrance through a pedestrian underpass at the eastern end. The western overpass exit was built in 2006. This was necessary as the station is one of the busiest on the radius due to the large amount of land transport coming from the northern left-bank districts and the local shopping center of Darnytsia.

References

External links
 Kyivsky Metropoliten - Station description and Photographs
 Metropoliten.kiev.ua - Station description and Photographs
 Zarohem.cz - Photographs
Google maps - Satellite view centered on the vestibule

Kyiv Metro stations
Railway stations opened in 1965
1965 establishments in Ukraine